Priscilla Betti (real name: Préscillia Betti; born August 2, 1989 in Nice), formerly known as simply Priscilla, is a French singer, dancer and actress. She released her first single at the age of 12, and has released five albums. In 2008–2011 she played the main part in the French musical TV series Chante!.

Biography
Priscilla Betti was born on August 2, 1989 into a family living in Nice (Alpes-Maritimes).

Her mother, Annie takes care of her career and her father, Jean-Pierre, is a painter in letters. Priscilla has two sisters : Sandra who is also a singer and Séverine who is a pharmacy assistant.

When Priscilla was eleven years old, she visited the show Drôles de petits champions, February 23, 2001, on TF1, and was noticed by a producer from the American company Metro-Goldwyn-Mayer, Patrick Debort. On September 25, she recorded her first single "Quand je serai jeune" for the record company BMG.

That same year, Priscilla went to New York and met her idol Britney Spears.  Spears presented her with a disque d'or for her single "Quand je serai jeune".

Betti's first album, Cette Vie nouvelle, was released in June 2002. It was certified Silver in France for sales of 50,000 copies. Her second album, Priscilla was released only six months after the first one, in December 2002. The album's first single, "Regarde-moi (teste-moi, déteste-moi)" was certified Gold in France for sales over 250,000 copies. Priscilla sold over 100,000 copies in France, and was certified Gold.

Betti's third album, Une Fille comme moi, was released in early 2004. The first single, "Toujours pas d'amour", peaked at number five on the French singles chart. The album peaked at number eight on the album chart, and was certified a Gold disc in France.

After following traditional schooling until the end of 8th grade, she decided not to enter secondary school, instead taking correspondence courses so that she could better concentrate on her artistic career.

Betti's fourth album, Bric à brac, was released in the summer of 2005. It peaked at number 20 on the French albums chart.

Starting from February 2008 Betti played the main part in the musical TV series Chante! on France 2 in the block programming KD2A. The fourth and last season aired in 2011. Songs from the first season were released as Betti's fifth album, Casse comme du verre, in December 2007. The album peaked only at number 111 on the French albums chart.

In the fall of 2014 Betti made her stage debut as the lead in a stage adaptation of the musical Flashdance which was shown in Théâtre du Gymnase in Paris until March 2015.

Discography

Studio albums

Singles

Filmography
 1999 : Annie (as "Annie", dialogue and singing in the French dub version)
 2004 : Albert est méchant
 2008-2011 : Chante ! (television series), also known as Studio 24

Bibliography
 Priscilla c'est moi, Michel Lafon Ed. (2003)
 Priscilla, Stéphanie-Anne Euranie, Rouchon Ed. (2003)
 Priscilla une étoile montante, Rouchon Ed. (2006)
 Chante !, Catherine Kalengula, Hachettes Ed. (2008)
 Chante !, Pilot et Torta, Soleil Productions Ed. (will be published on July 9, 2008)

Notes

References

External links
 Official website
  Official fan site
 

1989 births
Living people
People from Alpes-Maritimes
French child singers
French female dancers
French actresses
French people of Italian descent
People from Nice
Jive Records artists
Betti, Priscilla
21st-century French singers
21st-century French women singers